Dying in Stereo is the second release by New York City-based alternative hip hop group Northern State. It was first released on June 3, 2002 on Startime International, and then re-released in May 2003 by Columbia Records. It has been described variously as an EP and a "mini-album". Nevertheless, it is usually described as their official debut album, since their only previous release (Hip Hop You Haven't Heard) was a self-released four-song demo. This led PopMatters to describe it as a "litmus test" that will determine "what will happen to white, female, feminist rappers, who aren’t pencil-thin or supermodel pretty."

Reception
The album received generally favorable reviews from critics. The exceptions to this trend included Pitchfork Media, which gave it a scathing review in which the reviewer, Michael Idov, described the album as "the most heinous hip-hop release since MC Skat Kat went solo", and Drowned in Sound, which described Northern State as "a pointless hybrid of the Beastie Boys and *N-tyce (from the female wing of the Wu)." Many other critics also compared Dying in Stereo's music to that of the Beastie Boys.

Track listing

References

2002 debut albums
Startime International albums
Northern State (band) albums
Columbia Records albums